#2019GantiPresiden was a Twitter hashtag and social media campaign in which Indonesian users share their disapproval towards the Joko Widodo presidency. The main purpose of this campaign was a constitutional effort to replace the current president in the 2019 general election. The hashtag went viral after it was used by Prosperous Justice Party (PKS) politician Mardani Ali Sera on Twitter. In English, the term "Ganti Presiden" literally translates to "Replace the President."

Background 
The #2019GantiPresiden was introduced by Mardani Ali Sera in April 2018, a politician from the Prosperous Justice Party (PKS) which was at the time the opposition party to the Joko Widodo's government. He began spreading the hashtag throughout his social media, with the aim of providing political education to the public, and to elect a new president in the upcoming 2019 general election. Mardani's statement was reinforced by the statement of the PKS president, Sohibul Iman. Previously, a movement with the same name was also launched by Mardani on his personal Twitter account on March 27, 2018. According to Mardani in a tweet, the hashtag was the antithesis of Joko Widodo's campaign of supporters on social media.

Many social media accounts began to retweet the hashtag. Within a short period of time, T-shirts were produced with the hashtag, with Mardani denying that the movement is a political campaign due to a lack of a supported replacement. The movement garnered significant support from other opposition politicians, including Amien Rais (PAN) and Yusril Ihza Mahendra (PBB). Reasons cited include pressure on Islamic organizations, influx of immigrant workers (mainly from China) due to relaxation of immigration rules and economic issues such as a lack of available jobs and increased prices of necessities.

Impact
#2019ChangePresident inspired several parties to create related attributes such as T-shirts and bracelets. There was a #2019GantiPresiden t-shirt seller at the Great Indonesia Movement Party National Working Meeting for Law and Advocacy at the Sultan Hotel, Jakarta. Some merchants also serve the order of the T-shirt by order, due to the sensitivity of the topic. However, several other merchants held their wares at online stores such as Bukalapak, Tokopedia, Shopee, and Lazada.

Some social media users also posted the pictures with the hashtag while visiting several cities overseas. In a speech, Joko Widodo mocked that the hashtag and T-shirt cannot change a president. PDI-P secretary-general Hasto Kristiyanto accused the movement of being a political move by the opposition and not an organic movement. In the 2018 West Java gubernatorial election, the hashtag was prominently used by the Sudrajat/Ahmad Syaikhu in their campaign to gain potential voters and significantly increased his electoral vote from 5-9 percent in survey polls to 27-30 percent in real count results, although the pair ultimately lost.

Rallies
Some declarations and rallies supporting the campaign were made in several cities, such as Jakarta, Yogyakarta, and Surakarta. Supporters also tried to organize rallies in Serang, but was denied permission from the municipal government. In addition, the West Java branch of the Indonesian Ulema Council decried the movement, calling them "provocateurs".

Response

Politicians 
In response to the hashtag, president Joko Widodo responded by joking, "How can a t-shirt can change the President? It's the people who can replace the President, if the people want it, they can change it. Both are blessings from God. If you change the shirt, you can change the President." His response was supported by Sohibul Iman. Indonesian Democratic Party of Struggle (PDI-P) politician Eva Kusuma Sundari called the hashtag phenomenon, sad, due to the fact that the general election campaign had not even started yet. She also highlighted the increasingly intense efforts of the opposition party towards Joko Widodo.

Golkar Party politician Ace Hasan Syadzily responded  to the proliferation of t-shirts that read #2019GantiPresident by saying that the circulation of the t-shirts was an attempt to discredit the president, and said that the performance of the president's government was considered by the people to have been very satisfactory, according to a survey. Secretary of the NasDem party, Syarif Alkadrie, said that #2019ChangePresident was used by people who were frustrated with Joko Widodo's government. Coordinating Minister for Maritime Affairs Luhut Binsar Panjaitan said that #2019ChangePresident was only the wish of a few parties who wanted to replace Joko Widodo, feeling that it was natural for Joko Widodo to respond to the hashtag.

Ruhut Sitompul doubted that the #2019GantiPresiden movement would actually replace Joko Widodo, judging that PKS was unable to eject Fahri Hamzah from the position of Deputy Speaker of the People's Consultative Assembly, even though Fahri had been fired since 2016. Secretary General of the PDI-P Hasto Kristiyanto considered #2019GantiPresident not as an aspiration, but a political maneuver, saying that the opposition can't do anything when Joko Widodo's electability is high. Meanwhile, Politician Johnny G. Plate considered this movement unethical.

Election officials 
In April 2019, Abhan, the chairman of the Election Supervisory Body (BAWASLU), and Arief Budiman, the chairman of the General Elections Commission (KPU) were asked by PDI-P representative Komarudin Watubun regarding the hashtag. Both said that the hashtag didn't violate the law. As there were no special rules regarding the 2019 general election campaign, as they had not yet been made.

Satire 
Responding to the hashtag phenomenon #2019GantiPresiden, the Chairman of the United Development Party Romahurmuziy proposed the hashtag #Lanjutkan212, with details that Joko Widodo has led Surakarta City for 2 periods, led the Special Capital Region of Jakarta for one period,  and is currently leading Indonesia. Romahurmuzy hopes that Joko Widodo fulfills his hashtags proposal, of serving just one more term.

Secretary General of the NasDem Party Johnny G. Plate, who considered the movement unethical, insinuated supporters of the movement by saying "the president will definitely end in 2019, as we will change the president. But the person will not change. So all we have to do is add the hashtag #gantipresiden2019, just add in front of it 'ogah ah.'"

Aftermath 
In May 2019, after the 2019 election had passed, Mardani stated that the #2019GantiPresiden movement had "closed its books".

See also 
 Hashtag activism
 Politics of Indonesia
 Jokowi Effect

References

2018 in Internet culture
2019 in Internet culture
Joko Widodo
Hashtags
Internet-based activism